Synaphea decumbens is a shrub endemic to Western Australia.

The decumbent shrub usually blooms between September and October and produces yellow flowers.

It is found in the South West region of Western Australia between where it grows in sandy soils over laterite.

References

Eudicots of Western Australia
decumbens
Endemic flora of Western Australia
Plants described in 1995